Central Africa is a subregion of the African continent comprising various countries according to different definitions. Middle Africa is an analogous term used by the United Nations in its geoscheme for Africa and consists of the following countries: Angola, Burundi, Cameroon, Central African Republic, Chad, Democratic Republic of the Congo, Republic of the Congo, Equatorial Guinea, Gabon, Rwanda, and São Tomé and Príncipe. These eleven countries are members of the Economic Community of Central African States (ECCAS). Six of those countries (Cameroon, Central African Republic, Chad, Equatorial Guinea, Gabon, and Republic of the Congo) are also members of the Economic and Monetary Community of Central Africa (CEMAC) and share a common currency, the Central African CFA franc.

The African Development Bank, on the other hand, defines Central Africa as seven countries: Cameroon, Central African Republic, Chad, Republic of the Congo, Democratic Republic of Congo, Equatorial Guinea, and Gabon.

List of Central African countries

Background 

The Central African Federation (1953–1963), also called the Federation of Rhodesia and Nyasaland, was made up of what are now the nations of Malawi, Zambia, and Zimbabwe. Similarly, the Anglican Church of the Province of Central Africa covers dioceses in Botswana, Malawi, Zambia, and Zimbabwe, while the Church of Central Africa, Presbyterian has synods in Malawi, Zambia, and Zimbabwe. These states are now typically considered part of East or Southern Africa.

Geography

The Congo River basin has historically been ecologically significant to the populations of Central Africa, serving as an important supra-regional organization in Central Africa.

History

Prehistory
Archeological finds in Central Africa have been discovered dating back, over 100,000 years. According to Zagato and Holl, there is evidence of iron-smelting in the Central African Republic that may date back to 3000 to 2500 BCE.

Trade and improved agricultural techniques supported more sophisticated societies, leading to the early civilisations of West African civilisations Sao, Kanem, Bornu, Shilluk, Baguirmi, and Wadai.

Around 2500 BCE, Bantu migrants had reached the Great Lakes Region in Central Africa. Halfway through the first millennium BCE, the Bantu had also settled as far south as what is now Angola.

Ancient history

Sao civilization

The West African Sao civilization flourished from ca. the 6th century BCE to as late as the 16th century CE in northern Central Africa. The Sao lived by the Chari River south of Lake Chad in territory that later became part of Cameroon and Chad. They are the earliest people to have left clear traces of their presence in the territory of modern Cameroon. Today, several ethnic groups of northern Cameroon and southern Chad but particularly the Sara people claim descent from the civilization of the Sao. Sao artifacts show that they were skilled workers in bronze, copper, and iron. Finds include bronze sculptures and terra cotta statues of human and animal figures, coins, funerary urns, household utensils, jewelry, highly decorated pottery, and spears. The largest Sao archaeological finds have been made south of Lake Chad.

Kanem Empire

The West-Central African kingdom of Kanem–Bornu Empire was centered in the Lake Chad Basin. It was known as the Kanem Empire from the 9th century CE onward and lasted as the independent kingdom of Bornu until 1900. At its height it encompassed an area covering not only much of Chad, but also parts of modern eastern Niger, northeastern Nigeria, northern Cameroon and parts of South Sudan. The history of the Empire is mainly known from the Royal Chronicle or Girgam discovered in 1851 by the German traveler Heinrich Barth. Kanem rose in the 8th century in the region to the north and east of Lake Chad. The Kanem empire went into decline, shrank, and in the 14th century was defeated by Bilala invaders from the Lake Fitri region.

Bornu Empire

The Kanuri people of West Africa led by the Sayfuwa migrated to the west and south of the lake, where they established the Bornu Empire. By the late 16th century the Bornu empire had expanded and recaptured the parts of Kanem that had been conquered by the Bulala.  Satellite states of Bornu included the Damagaram in the west and Baguirmi to the southeast of Lake Chad.

Shilluk Kingdom

The Shilluk Kingdom was centered in South Sudan from the 15th century from along a strip of land along the western bank of White Nile, from Lake No to about 12° north latitude. The capital and royal residence were in the town of Fashoda. The kingdom was founded during the mid-fifteenth century CE by its first ruler, Nyikang. During the nineteenth century, the Shilluk Kingdom faced decline following military assaults from the Ottoman Empire and later British and Sudanese colonization in Anglo-Egyptian Sudan.

Baguirmi Kingdom

The Kingdom of Baguirmi existed as an independent state during the 16th and 17th centuries southeast of West-Central Africa Lake Chad region in what is now the country of Chad. Baguirmi emerged to the southeast of the Kanem–Bornu Empire. The kingdom's first ruler was Mbang Birni Besse. Later in his reign, the Bornu Empire conquered and made the state a tributary.

Wadai Empire

The Wadai Empire was centered in Chad from the 17th century. The Tunjur people founded the Wadai Kingdom to the east of Bornu in the 16th century. In the 17th century, there was a revolt of the Maba people who established a Muslim dynasty.
At first, Wadai paid tribute to Bornu and Durfur, but by the 18th century, Wadai was fully independent and had become an aggressor against its neighbors.

Lunda Empire

Following the Bantu Migration from Western Africa, Bantu kingdoms and empires began to develop in southern Central Africa. In the 1450s, a Luba from the royal family Ilunga Tshibinda married Lunda queen Rweej and united all Lunda peoples. Their son Mulopwe Luseeng expanded the kingdom. His son Naweej expanded the empire further and is known as the first Lunda emperor, with the title Mwata Yamvo (mwaant yaav, mwant yav), the "Lord of Vipers". The Luba political system was retained, and conquered peoples were integrated into the system. The mwata yamvo assigned a cilool or kilolo (royal adviser) and tax collector to each state conquered.

Numerous states claimed descent from the Lunda. The Imbangala of inland Angola claimed descent from a founder, Kinguri, brother of Queen Rweej, who could not tolerate the rule of mulopwe Tshibunda. Kinguri became the title of kings of states founded by Queen Rweej's brother. The Luena (Lwena) and Lozi (Luyani) in Zambia also claim descent from Kinguri. During the 17th century, a Lunda chief and warrior called Mwata Kazembe set up an Eastern Lunda kingdom in the valley of the Luapula River. The Lunda's western expansion also saw claims of descent by the Yaka and the Pende. The Lunda linked Central Africa with the western coast trade. The kingdom of Lunda came to an end in the 19th century when it was invaded by the Chokwe, who were armed with guns.

Kongo Kingdom

By the 15th century CE, the farming Bakongo people (ba being the plural prefix) were unified as the Kingdom of Kongo under a ruler called the manikongo, residing in the fertile Pool Malebo area on the lower Congo River. The capital was M'banza-Kongo. With superior organization, they were able to conquer their neighbors and extract tribute. They were experts in metalwork, pottery, and weaving raffia cloth. They stimulated interregional trade via a tribute system controlled by the manikongo. Later, maize (corn) and cassava (manioc) would be introduced to the region via trade with the Portuguese at their ports at Luanda and Benguela. The maize and cassava would result in population growth in the region and other parts of Africa, replacing millet as the main staple.

By the 16th century, the manikongo held authority from the Atlantic in the west to the Kwango River in the east. Each territory was assigned a mani-mpembe (provincial governor) by the manikongo. In 1506, Afonso I (1506–1542), a Christian, took over the throne. Slave trading increased with Afonso's wars of conquest. About 1568 to 1569, the Jaga invaded Kongo, laying waste to the kingdom and forcing the manikongo into exile. In 1574, Manikongo Álvaro I was reinstated with the help of Portuguese mercenaries. During the latter part of the 1660s, the Portuguese tried to gain control of Kongo. Manikongo António I (1661–1665), with a Kongolese army of 5,000, was destroyed by an army of Afro-Portuguese at the Battle of Mbwila. The empire dissolved into petty polities, fighting among each other for war captives to sell into slavery.

Kongo gained captives from the Kingdom of Ndongo in wars of conquest. Ndongo was ruled by the ngola. Ndongo would also engage in slave trading with the Portuguese, with São Tomé being a transit point to Brazil. The kingdom was not as welcoming as Kongo; it viewed the Portuguese with great suspicion and as an enemy. The Portuguese in the latter part of the 16th century tried to gain control of Ndongo but were defeated by the Mbundu. Ndongo experienced depopulation from slave raiding. The leaders established another state at Matamba, affiliated with Queen Nzinga, who put up a strong resistance to the Portuguese until coming to terms with them. The Portuguese settled along the coast as trade dealers, not venturing on conquest of the interior. Slavery wreaked havoc in the interior, with states initiating wars of conquest for captives. The Imbangala formed the slave-raiding state of Kasanje, a major source of slaves during the 17th and 18th centuries.

Modern history

During the Conference of Berlin in 1884–85 Africa was divided up between the European colonial powers, defining boundaries that are largely intact with today's post-colonial states. On 5 August 1890 the British and French concluded an agreement to clarify the boundary between French West Africa and what would become Nigeria. A boundary was agreed along a line from Say on the Niger to Barruwa on Lake Chad, but leaving the Sokoto Caliphate in the British sphere. Parfait-Louis Monteil was given charge of an expedition to discover where this line actually ran.
On 9 April 1892 he reached Kukawa on the shore of the lake.
Over the next twenty years a large part of the Chad Basin was incorporated by treaty or by force into French West Africa. On 2 June 1909, the Wadai capital of Abéché was occupied by the French. The remainder of the basin was divided by the British in Nigeria, who took Kano in 1903, and the Germans in Cameroon.

The countries of the basin regained their independence between 1956 and 1962, retaining the colonial administrative boundaries. Chad, Gabon, the Republic of the Congo, and the Central African Republic became autonomous states with the dissolution of French Equatorial Africa in 1958, gaining full independence in 1960. The Democratic Republic of the Congo also gained independence from Belgium in 1960, but quickly devolved into a period of political upheaval and conflict known as the Congo Crisis (19601965) which ended with the installment of Joseph Mobutu as president and renamed the country Zaire in 1971. Burundi claimed independence from Belgian Ruanda-Urundi in 1962, becoming a constitutional monarchy under Mwami Mwambutsa IV. Rwanda, also part of Ruanda-Urundi, gained independence in 1962 following the ethnic violence of the Rwandan Revolution, transitioning from a Tutsi monarchy to a Hutu-dominated republic. Equatorial Guinea gained independence from Spain in 1968, leading to the election of Francisco Macías Nguema, now widely regarded as one of the most brutal dictators in history. In 1961, Angola became involved in the Portuguese Colonial War, a 13-year-long struggle for independence in Lusophone Africa. It gained independence only in 1975, following the 1974 Carnation Revolution in Lisbon. São Tomé and Príncipe also gained independence in 1975 in the aftermath of the Carnation Revolution. In 2011, South Sudan gained its independence from the Republic of Sudan after over 50 years of war.

In the 21st century, many jihadist and Islamist groups began to operate in the Central African region, including the Seleka and the Ansaru.

Over the course of the 2010s, the internationally unrecognized secessionist state called Ambazonia gained increasing momentum in its home regions, resulting in the ongoing Anglophone Crisis in Cameroon.

Economy

The main economic activities of Central Africa are farming, herding and fishing. At least 40% of the rural population of northern and eastern Central Africa lives in poverty and routinely face chronic food shortages. Crop production based on rain is possible only in the southern belt. Slash-and-burn agriculture is a common practice. Flood recession agriculture is practiced around Lake Chad and in the riverine wetlands. Nomadic herders migrate with their animals into the grasslands of the northern part of the basin for a few weeks during each short rainy season, where they intensively graze the highly nutritious grasses. When the dry season starts they move back south, either to grazing lands around the lakes and floodplains, or to the savannas further to the south.

In the 2000–01 period, fisheries in the Lake Chad basin provided food and income to more than 10 million people, with a harvest of about 70,000 tons. Fisheries have traditionally been managed by a system where each village has recognized rights over a defined part of the river, wetland or lake, and fishers from elsewhere must seek permission and pay a fee to use this area. The governments only enforced rules and regulations to a limited extent. Local governments and traditional authorities are increasingly engaged in rent-seeking, collecting license fees with the help of the police or army.

Oil is also a major export of the countries of northern and eastern Central Africa, notably making up a large proportion of the GDPs of Chad and South Sudan.

Demographics

Following the Bantu Migration, Central Africa is primarily inhabited by Bantu peoples and Bantu languages predominate. These include the Mongo, Kongo and Luba peoples. Central Africa also includes many Nilo-Saharan and Niger-Congo Ubangian communities: in north western Central Africa the Nilo-Saharan Kanuri predominate. Most of the Ubangian speakers in Africa (often grouped with Niger-Congo) are also found in Central Africa, such as the Gbaya, Banda and Zande, in northern Central Africa.

Notable Central African supra-regional organizations include the Lake Chad Basin Commission and the Economic Community of Central African States.

The predominant religions of Central Africa are Christianity and traditional faiths. Islam is also practiced in some areas in Chad and the Central African Republic.

Due to common historical processes and widespread demographic movements between the countries of Central Africa before the Bantu Migration into much of southern Central Africa, the cultures of the region evidence many similarities and interrelationships. Similar cultural practices stemming from common origins as largely Nilo-Saharan or Bantu peoples are also evident in Central Africa including in music, dance, art, body adornment, initiation, and marriage rituals.

Some major ethnic groups in Central Africa are as follows:

Culture

Clothing

Cuisine

Music

Religion

Film industry

Architecture

Further information in the sections of Architecture of Africa:
 Ancient Central African Architecture
 Medieval Central African Architecture

Science and technology

Further information in the sections of History of science and technology in Africa:
 Mathematics
 Textiles
 Communication systems
 By country

See also

British Central Africa Protectorate (1891–1907, now Malawi)
Central African Federation (1953–1963, now Malawi, Zambia and Zimbabwe)
French Equatorial Africa
Mittelafrika
Royal Museum for Central Africa (Brussels, Belgium)

References

Bibliography

External links

Afrique Centrale.org
Africa Interactive Map from the United States Army Africa
African Pygmies—Among the earliest inhabitants of Central Africa

Central Africa
Geography of Central Africa
Regions of Africa
Articles containing video clips